Make Your Mama Proud is the debut album released by the rock band Fastball. The track "Are You Ready For The Fallout?" was issued to some radio stations as the single for the record.

The album had sold over 5,500 copies as of April 1998.

Critical reception
Trouser Press wrote that Fastball "never sacrifices melody to haste, and the results bounce with nifty, cheek-poking ease."

Track listing

Personnel
 Tony Scalzo  - vocals, bass guitar, keyboards, guitar
 Miles Zuniga - vocals, guitar
 Joey Shuffield  - drums, percussion

References

1996 debut albums
Fastball (band) albums
Hollywood Records albums